Ken Sigaty (born 1944 or 1945) is a Canadian football player who played for the Edmonton Eskimos. He previously played football for the Edmonton Huskies.

References

Living people
1940s births
Edmonton Elks players